The Rugby League Reserve Team Championship is a rugby league competition for the reserve teams of the British-based Super League clubs. Having a reserve team is a compulsory part of the minimum criteria to hold a Super League licence, but Catalans Dragons have dispensation to run their reserve team in the French Elite League for logistical reasons.

The Rugby League Reserve Team First Division is a rugby league competition for the reserve teams of Championship clubs, although there is no longer an obligation for clubs in the Championship to enter a reserve team.

History
The previous competition for reserve teams was known as the Alliance and on occasion featured the first teams of non-league semi-professional clubs including Hemel Stags and Blackpool Gladiators.

The current competition was formed in 2006 as a replacement for the Senior Academy competition for under-21s. Unlike the Senior Academy, which had a grading phase to divide teams into the Championship and First Division based on playing strength of the Senior Academy side, the Reserve Team Championship is exclusively for the reserve teams of Super League clubs and the Reserve Team First Division is exclusively for the reserve teams of Championship clubs.

In 2007 and 2008 there was an obligation for National League One (but not National League Two) clubs to run a reserve team (with Celtic Crusaders getting dispensation in 2008 to run theirs in the Rugby League Conference National Division, this has been dropped for the 2009 season, resulting in a smaller First Division.

In 2010 the Championship will change to a Super League under-20s (featuring the 12 English Super League sides, Crusaders have withdrawn following the move to Wrexham with most of the players joining South Wales Scorpions) and the First Division will remain as a Championship Reserve division. In 2011 the Championship reserve competition became U23 albeit with five over age players allowed.

In 2013 the Championship U23 had only four entrants (Halifax, Featherstone Rovers, Keighley Cougars and Leigh Centurions) so it was agreed that they could play games between them under the U23 rules and other games would be U20 with two over age players. With teams playing uneven numbers of games the league will be a merit league.

2013 Championship U20/U23 Competition
Featherstone Rovers 
Halifax 
Hemel Stags
Keighley Cougars
Leigh Centurions
Oldham 
Rochdale Hornets
Salford City Reds
South Wales Scorpions
York City Knights

2012 Championship Reserve U23 Competition
Featherstone Rovers Reserves
Halifax Reserves
Keighley Cougars Reserves
Oldham Reserves
Sheffield Eagles Reserves
York City Knights Reserves (failed to complete the season)

2011 Championship Reserve U23 Competition
Dewsbury Rams Reserves
Featherstone Rovers Reserves
Halifax Reserves
Keighley Cougars Reserves
Leigh Centurions Reserves
Oldham Reserves
Sheffield Eagles Reserves
Whitehaven Reserves
Widnes Vikings Reserves
York City Knights Reserves

2010 Championship Reserve Competition
Dewsbury Rams Reserves
Featherstone Rovers Reserves
Hunslet Hawks Reserves
Keighley Cougars Reserves
Leigh Centurions Reserves
Oldham Reserves
Sheffield Eagles Reserves
Whitehaven Reserves
Widnes Vikings Reserves
York City Knights Reserves

NB: Barrow Raiders Reserves entered but failed to complete the season

Competing clubs in 2009

Championship 
Bradford Bulls Reserves
Castleford Tigers Reserves
Crusaders Reserves
Harlequins Reserves
Huddersfield Giants Reserves
Hull F.C. Reserves
Hull Kingston Rovers Reserves
Leeds Rhinos Reserves
St. Helens Reserves
Salford City Reds Reserves
Wakefield Trinity Wildcats Reserves
Warrington Wolves Reserves
Wigan Warriors Reserves

First Division 
Barrow Raiders Reserves
Dewsbury Rams Reserves
Doncaster Reserves
Featherstone Rovers Reserves
Hunslet Hawks Reserves
Keighley Cougars Reserves
Leigh Centurions Reserves
Oldham Reserves
Sheffield Eagles Reserves
Whitehaven Reserves
Widnes Vikings Reserves
York City Knights Reserves

Previous winners

2006
Championship:
First Division:

2007
Championship:
First Division:

2008
Championship: Wigan Warriors
First Division: Widnes Vikings

Competing clubs by season

2006
Championship: Bradford Bulls, Castleford Tigers, Harlequins, Huddersfield Giants, Hull FC, Leeds Rhinos, St Helens, Salford City Reds, Wakefield Trinity Wildcats, Warrington Wolves, Wigan Warriors
First Division: Batley Bulldogs, Dewsbury Rams, Doncaster Lakers, Featherstone Rovers, Halifax, Hull Kingston Rovers, Hunslet Hawks, Keighley Cougars, Leigh Centurions, Whitehaven, Widnes Vikings, York City Knights (Gateshead Thunder entered a reserve team but they withdrew before the season started)

2007
Championship: Bradford Bulls, Harlequins, Huddersfield Giants, Hull FC, Hull Kingston Rovers Leeds Rhinos, St Helens, Salford City Reds, Wakefield Trinity Wildcats, Warrington Wolves, Wigan Warriors
First Division: Barrow Vikings, Batley Bulldogs, Castleford Tigers, Dewsbury Rams, Doncaster Lakers, Featherstone Rovers, Halifax, Hunslet Hawks, Keighley Cougars, Leigh Centurions, Rochdale Hornets, Sheffield Eagles, Swinton Lions, Whitehaven, Widnes Vikings, Workington Town, York City Knights (Doncaster Lakers Reserves resigned mid-season when the club went into administration)

2008
Championship: Bradford Bulls, Castleford Tigers Harlequins, Huddersfield Giants, Hull FC, Hull Kingston Rovers Leeds Rhinos, St Helens, Wakefield Trinity Wildcats, Warrington Wolves, Wigan Warriors
First Division: Barrow Vikings, Batley Bulldogs, Dewsbury Rams, Featherstone Rovers, Halifax, Hunslet Hawks, Keighley Cougars, Leigh Centurions, Oldham, Rochdale Hornets, Salford City Reds, Sheffield Eagles, Whitehaven, Widnes Vikings, Workington Town, York City Knights

External links
Super League Official website
Championship official website
Up to date Championship table on RFL official website
Up to date First Division table on RFL website

Super League